Okine is a surname. Notable persons with that name include:

 Earl Okine (born 1990), American football defensive end
 Emmanuel Okine (born 1991), Ghanaian footballer
 Joshua Okine (born 1980), Ghanaian boxer
 Matt Okine (born 1985), Australian comedian, actor, and radio presenter
 Robert Okine (born 1937), Ghanaian bishop
 Sheila Okine (born 1979), Ghanaian footballer

See also
 Hayley Okines (1997–2015), English girl with the extremely rare aging disease progeria